Strunin is a surname. Notable people with the surname include:

 Leo Strunin, president of the Royal College of Anaesthetists
 Sasha Strunin (born 1989), Polish singer, actress, and model
 Sasha Strunin discography